In statistics, Dixon's Q test, or simply the Q test, is used for identification and rejection of outliers.  This assumes normal distribution and per Robert Dean and Wilfrid Dixon, and others, this test should be used sparingly and never more than once in a data set.  To apply a Q test for bad data, arrange the data in order of increasing values and calculate Q as defined:

 

Where gap is the absolute difference between the outlier in question and the closest number to it.  If Q > Qtable, where Qtable is a reference value corresponding to the sample size and confidence level, then reject the questionable point.  Note that only one point may be rejected from a data set using a Q test.

Example
Consider the data set:

Now rearrange in increasing order:

We hypothesize that 0.167 is an outlier. Calculate Q:

With 10 observations and at 90% confidence, Q = 0.455 > 0.412 = Qtable, so we conclude 0.167 is indeed an outlier. However, at 95% confidence, Q = 0.455 < 0.466 = Qtable 0.167 is not considered an outlier.

McBane notes: Dixon provided related tests intended to search for more than one outlier, but they are much less frequently used than the r10 or Q version that is intended to eliminate a single outlier.

Table
This table summarizes the limit values of the two-tailed Dixon's Q test.

See also
Grubbs's test for outliers

References

Further reading
 Robert B. Dean and Wilfrid J. Dixon (1951) "Simplified Statistics for Small Numbers of Observations". Anal. Chem., 1951, 23 (4), 636–638. Abstract Full text PDF
 Rorabacher, D. B. (1991) "Statistical Treatment for Rejection of Deviant Values: Critical Values of Dixon Q Parameter and Related Subrange Ratios at the 95 percent Confidence Level". Anal. Chem., 63 (2), 139–146. PDF (including larger tables of limit values)
 McBane, George C. (2006) "Programs to Compute Distribution Functions and Critical Values for Extreme Value Ratios for Outlier Detection". J. Statistical Software 16(3):1–9, 2006 Article (PDF) and Software (Fortan-90, Zipfile)
 Shivanshu Shrivastava, A. Rajesh, P. K. Bora (2014) "Sliding window Dixon's tests for malicious users' suppression in a cooperative spectrum sensing system" IET Communications, 2014, 8 (7)
W. J. Dixon. The Annals of Mathematical Statistics. Vol. 21, No. 4 (Dec., 1950), pp. 488-506

External links
 Main page of GNU R's package 'outlier' includes 'dixon.test' function.
 Dixon's test in Communications – use of Dixon's test in cognitive radio communications (by Shivanshu Shrivastava)

Statistical tests
Robust statistics
Statistical outliers